Boulevard Park may refer to the following places in the United States:

 Boulevard Park, Sacramento, California, a neighborhood
 Boulevard Park (Worcester, Massachusetts), a former baseball park
 Boulevard Park, a former baseball park in Detroit, Michigan
 Boulevard Park (Newport News, Virginia), a park in Newport News, Virginia
 Boulevard Park, Washington, a census-designated place
 Boulevard Park, a park in Bellingham, Washington